The Zweibel Farmstead is a historic estate with a farm house and several outbuildings in Papillion, Nebraska. It was established by George Zweibel and his wife Sophia. The house was built with limestone in 1867, followed by a barn, also built with limestone, in 1871. The property was inherited by their descendants, who lived in the house until the 1960s. It has been listed on the National Register of Historic Places since November 30, 2000.

References

Houses completed in 1867
1867 establishments in Nebraska
Farms on the National Register of Historic Places in Nebraska
National Register of Historic Places in Sarpy County, Nebraska